Yik Nam Jason Wu (born August 2, 1993), known professionally as Rabitt, is an Grammy Award and Emmy Award nominated record producer and songwriter from Hong Kong, now based in Los Angeles, CA. Rabitt has produced and written songs for Andy Grammer, Kiiara, Charlotte Lawrence, VÉRITÉ, Álvaro Soler, Eric Nam, Ingrid Andress, and others.

Early life and education 
Wu was born and raised in Hong Kong. He started playing piano at the age of 5 and soon developed a passion for the drums. He then attended Berklee College of Music in 2011 and moved to Los Angeles, California shortly after graduation. It was at Berklee where he would meet the woman who would eventually sign him to her label, Kara DioGuardi, CEO of Arthouse Entertainment. DioGuardi is a visiting scholar with expertise in songwriting at Berklee.

Wu credits his parents' moral and financial support with allowing him to succeed in the music industry.

In 2014, Wu signed his first publishing deal with Universal Music Publishing and Arthouse Entertainment. The deal helped him obtain the visa necessary to stay in the United States after finishing school.

Professional career 

After connecting with DioGuardi, Wu collaborated with another of Arthouse Entertainment's artists, Claire Rachel Wilkinson, then going by the name Clairity. Wu's production was featured on her 2015 debut EP "Alienation".

Wu co-wrote and produced Andy Grammer's 2017 track "Freeze," off his album 
"The Good Parts".  It was the last song Grammer wrote for the album and he considered it a "little ode" to his days as a street performer singing "Sunday Morning" by Maroon 5. In 2019, Wu said hearing the song play in Italian underwear store Calzedonia was the "proudest moment of his career".

In 2018, Wu co-wrote and produced an original composition titled "Perfume Smoke" for the soap opera General Hospital. The song was nominated for an Outstanding Original Song - Drama Emmy at the 45th Daytime Emmy Awards.

Discography

Awards and nominations
 EMMY Award
 2016: Outstanding Original Song - Drama - "Perfume Smoke" - ABC's, General Hospital (Nominated)

 GRAMMY Award
 2021: Best Country Album - "Lady Like" - Ingrid Andress (Nominated)

References

External links
 Rabitt - Universal Publishing Media Group
 Rabitt - Arthouse Entertainment

1993 births
Living people
Hong Kong record producers
Hong Kong songwriters
Hong Kong musicians
Berklee College of Music alumni